Taiping is a town in Zhenyuan County, Gansu province, China. , it administers the following 13 villages:
Jianbian Village
Lanmiao Village
Xilan Village
Zaolin Village
Chaizhuang Village
Muping Village
Laozhuang Village
Dayuan Village
Dingxian Village
Nanzhuang Village
Hewan Village
Pengyang Village
Liuju Village

References

Township-level divisions of Gansu
Zhenyuan County, Gansu